The Albion Carnegie Library, at 437 S. 3rd St. in Albion, Nebraska, is a Carnegie library built in 1908 which was listed on the National Register of Historic Places in 2019.

It was one of 69 libraries in Nebraska built from Andrew Carnegie funding, and was still serving as Albion's public library in 2019.  It was designed by architects the Eisentraut-Colby-Pottenger Company.

References

External links
News story including photo

Carnegie libraries in Nebraska
National Register of Historic Places in Boone County, Nebraska
Library buildings completed in 1908